Nikita Serhiyovych Petruk (born 8 June 2003) is a Ukrainian professional footballer who plays as a central midfielder for Ukrainian First League club Polissya Zhytomyr.

References

External links
 
 

2003 births
Living people
Footballers from Zhytomyr
Ukrainian footballers
Ukraine youth international footballers
Association football midfielders
FC Rukh Lviv players
FC Polissya Zhytomyr players
Ukrainian First League players